"Äärirajoille" is a song by Finnish rapper Cheek. The song peaked at number four on the Finnish Singles Chart.

Charts

References

2014 singles
2014 songs
Cheek (rapper) songs
Finnish-language songs
Warner Music Group singles
Song articles with missing songwriters